The Journal of Diabetes Investigation is a bimonthly peer-reviewed medical journal covering the study of diabetes. It was established in 2010 and is published by John Wiley & Sons on behalf of the Asian Association for the Study of Diabetes, of which it is the official journal. The editor-in-chief is Nigishi Hotta (Chubu Rosai Hospital). In 2014, the journal became open-access. According to the Journal Citation Reports, the journal has a 2020 impact factor of 4.232.

References

External links

Wiley (publisher) academic journals
Endocrinology journals
Publications established in 2010
Bimonthly journals
English-language journals
Open access journals